The discography of the American post-hardcore band Finch consists of three studio albums, two live albums, one acoustic album, three extended plays, eight singles and six music videos.

Albums

Studio albums

Live albums 

 A Far Cry from Home (2009, In-n-Out)
 What It Is to Burn – X Live (2014, Tragic Hero)

Acoustic albums 

 Steel, Wood and Whiskey (2015, self-released)

Extended plays

Singles

Other appearances

Music videos

References 

Discographies of American artists